James Ashurst (died 1679), was an English divine who lost his living in the Great Ejection of 1662.

Biography
Ashurst was vicar of Arlesey, in Bedfordshire, and had been episcopally ordained, but he could not comply with the new impositions of the Act of Uniformity, and hence quit his living. He was very old, and his vicarage slender. Samuel Browne, the judge, was one of his parishioners, and a great friend. "The whole parish", says Palmer (after Calamy),

From the register-book of births, deaths, and marriages of the Parish of Arlesey, it is found that Ashurst became vicar between 27 October 1631 and 4 October 1632, and that he was married to Mary Baldocke, widow of Daniel Baldocke, on 20 November 1660. The same register states that James Ashurst, minister, was buried 16 December 1679 ("buried in woolen"). His neighbour, Read, of Henlow, preached his funeral sermon.

References

Attribution
 Grosart cites sources:
Samuel Palmer Nonconformist's Memorial (1802). i. 281;
local researches at Arlesey

Further reading

Year of birth unknown
1679 deaths
Ejected English ministers of 1662
People from Arlesey